The Three Obediences and Four Virtues is a set of moral principles and social code of behavior for maiden and married women in East Asian Confucianism, especially in Ancient and Imperial China. Women were to obey their fathers, husbands, and sons, and to be modest and moral in their actions and speech. Some imperial eunuchs both observed these principles themselves and enforced them in imperial harems, aristocratic households and society at large.

Terminology 
The two terms ("three obediences" and "four virtues") first appeared in the Book of Etiquette and Ceremonial and in the Rites of Zhou respectively, which codified the protocol for an elegant and refined culture for Chinese civilization. The protocol was originally meant to define the various parts of a harmonious society and not intended as a rule book. This code has heavily influenced ancient and imperial China and influenced other East Asian civilizations such as Japan and Korea as prescribed East Asian social philosophical thoughts even into the twentieth century.

Three Feminine Obediences 
A woman is obligated not to act on her own initiatives and must submissively obey or follow:

 her father at home, before getting married (or )
 her husband after getting married (or )
 her sons after her husband's death

Four Feminine Virtues 

The Four Feminine Virtues are: 

 Feminine Conduct
 Feminine Speech
 Feminine Comportment
 Feminine Works

Ban Zhao (49–120 CE), the first known female Chinese historian, elaborated on these in her treatise Lessons for Women:

See also 
 Three Fundamental Bonds and Five Constant Virtues

References

Bibliography 

Confucian ethics
Filial piety
East Asian philosophy
Social philosophy
Women in China